Xia Baolong (born 2 December 1952) is a Chinese politician. Originally from Tianjin, Xia began his political career in the Communist Youth League. He served as the vice mayor of Tianjin, governor and Communist Party Secretary of Zhejiang province. Between 2018 and 2023, he served as a vice chairman of the 13th Chinese People's Political Consultative Conference (CPPCC), being its secretary general from 2018 to 2020. Xia was appointed director of the Hong Kong and Macau Affairs Office in February 2020.

Early life
Xia Baolong was born in Tianjin. In his youth, Xia was an elementary and high school teacher in Hebei and Tianjin, and a grassroots level official of the Communist Youth League. He joined the Chinese Communist Party in November 1973. He received a degree in Chinese from Hexi District Workers' University, an adult-education college, in 1980. Later he rose to the positions of Party Secretary and governor of Hexi District, and then Vice Mayor of Tianjin. Between 1999 and 2003 he studied political economics at Peking University. He has a doctoral degree in Economics.

Political career 
Xia Baolong was an alternate member of the 15th, 16th, and 17th Central Committees, and a full member of the 18th Central Committee of the Chinese Communist Party.

Zhejiang 
In November 2003, Xia was transferred to Zhejiang to become a Deputy Party Secretary of the province. Xia served under then-Zhejiang Party Secretary Xi Jinping. In August 2011, he became the acting governor of Zhejiang, succeeding Lü Zushan, and was officially elected as governor in January 2012. On 18 December 2012, he was promoted to Communist Party Secretary of Zhejiang, the top political office of the province.

Xia is alleged to have issued orders for the removal of thousands of crosses from churches, including the Sanjiang Church in the Wenzhou area. Wenzhou is considered a centre of Christianity in China.

Under Xia, Zhejiang hosted the 2016 G20 Summit in Hangzhou. He also attempted to attract Zhejiang businesspeople from abroad. In April 2017 he became a member of the National People's Congress Environment Protection and Resources Conservation Committee.

Hong Kong 
On 13 February 2020, Xia was appointed director of the Hong Kong and Macau Affairs Office.

In August 2020, Xia and ten other officials were sanctioned by the United States Department of the Treasury under Executive Order 13936 by President Trump for undermining Hong Kong's autonomy. On October 14, 2020, the United States Department of State released a report on 10 individuals who materially contributed to the failure of the China to meet its obligations under the Sino–British Joint Declaration and Hong Kong's Basic Law. Xia was on the list. 

In February 2021, Xia said that only "patriots" could govern Hong Kong, and that positions in the executive, legislature and judiciary must follow the order. Xia also claimed that "In terms of those rioters who are anti-China and who instigate riots with extremely notorious acts, for example, Jimmy Lai, Benny Tai and Joshua Wong, they are not only prohibited from interfering in any public power of the HKSAR, they also need to be punished severely in accordance with the law." Additionally, Xia said that principle of "patriots" governing Hong Kong should also extend towards the education system.

In December 2021, Xia said that the people of Hong Kong would soon get "real" democracy under the new electoral system, where only "patriots" are allowed to serve.

References 

Living people
1952 births
Governors of Zhejiang
Chinese Communist Party politicians from Tianjin
People's Republic of China politicians from Tianjin
Political office-holders in Tianjin
Vice Chairpersons of the National Committee of the Chinese People's Political Consultative Conference
Individuals sanctioned by the United States under the Hong Kong Autonomy Act